The Luconia Shoals, divided into the North and South Luconia Shoals, and sometimes known as the Luconia Reefs, are one of the largest and least-known reef complexes in the South China Sea. Some geographers classify the shoals as the southernmost part of the Spratly Islands.

Location
The shoals are either part of the Spratly Islands, or southeast of what some sources consider to be the southernmost members of the Spratly Islands, such as Louisa Reef. There are extensive oil and natural gas resources under the seabed in this area, which is also home to various fish including manta rays, wrasse, and grouper. The shoals are also where the British barque  was wrecked on 5 January 1842.

The Chinese name for the shoals 'Kang' is the shortened form of 'Lo-kang-nia' - a transliteration of the English language name, Luconia. The Republic of China's Maps Inspection Committee published this name in 1935.

The English language name, Luconia, is from an old name of the island of Luzon in the Philippines, depicted in old Latin, Italian, and Portuguese maps as "Luçonia" or "Luconia."

Features

1) Hardie Reef, Aitken Reef and Buck Reef, from north to south, are part of an atoll which, as a whole, is named by the Chinese as: 盟谊南 or Méng yì nán, which translates as Friendship South.
2) Sierra Blanca Reef is also listed separately from South Luconia Shoals, situated about 12 miles southwestward of the latter. Its least depth is given as 2½ fathoms.

Satellite Images

Territorial disputes
The Luconia shoals are administered by Malaysia, and are claimed by the Republic of China (Taiwan) and the People's Republic of China.

Malaysia 
The shoals are administered by Malaysia, and the Royal Malaysian Navy and Malaysian Maritime Enforcement Agency maintains a 24/7 presence in the area to monitor the shoals. Malaysia's Fisheries Research Institute has conducted studies on the area since 2004. Malaysia organises an annual International Deep Sea Fishing Tournament on the shoals with participants departing from the Marina May in Miri and heading up to the area for 3 days. The participant who catches the biggest fish is proclaimed the winner of the tournament.

On 31 August 2015, amateur marine archaeologist Captain Hans Berekoven with his wife and a team of marine researchers, as well as the Sarawak Museum curator, went to the shoals to plant a Malaysian flag. Berekoven said the move was important to warn China to back down, and to urge the Malaysian government to take a serious look into the archaeological history of the area because the Sunda Shelf may have hosted a civilisation 12,000 years ago.

China 
In June 2015, Malaysian authorities detected a China Coast Guard vessel entering the area. It appears to be anchored at the shoals, about 150 kilometres north of Malaysian Borneo—well inside the  exclusive economic zone claimed by Malaysia. The Chinese vessel has been warned to leave the area and is monitored closely by the Royal Malaysian Navy. Malaysia lodged a protest over China's incursion into its waters, as Chinese ships had been in Malaysian waters for more than two years. We are taking diplomatic action but in whatever approach, they have to get out of our national waters". The Malaysian government has since sent diplomatic notes every week to protest against the intrusion. There have also been reports that crews aboard the Chinese vessel threatened to shoot local Malaysian fishermen who attempted to fish in the area.

On 31 March 2016, Malaysia summoned the Chinese ambassador in Kuala Lumpur to protest the presence of around 100 Chinese fishing boats at Luconia Shoals. Until March, the Malaysian government rarely rebuked China in public to avoid disturbances to Sino-Malay relations as Beijing emerges as the Malaysian economy's main investor. Kuala Lumpur has "consistently played down China's activities in our territories", said Wan Saiful Wan Jan, chief executive of the Institute for Democracy and Economic Affairs, a Malaysian think tank. "This could be to protect our commercial interest, or it could also be to avoid the public...realising how useless our defences are".

See also
 South China Sea Islands
 List of islands in the South China Sea
 Territorial disputes in the South China Sea

References

External links
 Tactical Pilotage Chart 1:250,000 Map Sheet L-11 A
 Oblique aerial photograph of Luconia Breakers (drying reef)

 
Reefs of the South China Sea